The Curator sea catfish (Cathorops raredonae), also known as the Raredon's sea catfish, is a species of catfish in the family Ariidae. It was described by Alexandre Pires Marceniuk, Ricardo Betancur-Rodríguez and Arturo Acero Pizarro in 2009. It is a tropical, marine and freshwater-dwelling fish which occurs between Mexico and El Salvador.

References

Ariidae
Fish described in 2009